Islam Adel (born July 1, 1988) is an Egyptian professional footballer who plays as a defensive midfielder . In 2016, Adel signed a 3-year contract for Misr Lel-Makkasa in a free transfer as his contract with Wadi Degla expired. He participated in 3 matches with Makkasa in 2016–17 Egyptian Premier League in which they finished 2nd. He previously played for El-Entag El-Harby, Telephonat Beni Suef and Wadi Degla. In July 2017, he signed a 2-year contract for El Raja SC in a free transfer.

He moved to Saudi club Al-Jandal in 2018.

References

1988 births
Living people
Egyptian footballers
Association football midfielders
El Entag El Harby SC players
Misr Lel Makkasa SC players
Telephonat Beni Suef SC players
Wadi Degla SC players
El Raja SC players
Al Jandal Club players
Egyptian Premier League players
Saudi Second Division players
Egyptian expatriate sportspeople in Saudi Arabia
Expatriate footballers in Saudi Arabia